Brian "Chainsaw" Campbell is a Greater Seattle area game developer, author and editor who is credited for working in the role-playing game industry as far back as 1993. Brian's notable work includes Werewolf: The Apocalypse, Mage: The Ascension, Changeling: The Dreaming, Ratkin, and other World of Darkness products for White Wolf, the d20 versions of Call of Cthulhu and Star Wars for Wizards of the Coast, indie games such as Spaceship Zero for Green Ronin and Fading Suns for Holistic Design, Inc., and a foray into board games that included Betrayal at House on the Hill from Avalon Hill.

External links 
 
 
 An Interview with Brian Campbell.
 Bio for the Star Wars work on the WotC web site.

American fantasy writers
American male novelists
American science fiction writers
Dungeons & Dragons game designers
Living people
Novelists from Washington (state)
White Wolf game designers
Writers from Seattle
Year of birth missing (living people)